William III of Isenburg-Wied was the Count of Isenburg-Wied from 1413 until 1462.

House of Isenburg